Rajanikant Singh is an Indian politician and Member of Odisha Legislative Assembly from Angul Assembly constituency who is serving as Deputy Speaker of Odisha Legislative Assembly.

References 

Living people
Odisha MLAs 2004–2009
Odisha politicians
Odisha MLAs 2009–2014
Odisha MLAs 2014–2019
Odisha MLAs 2019–2024
People from Angul district
Year of birth missing (living people)
Biju Janata Dal politicians
Deputy Speakers of the Odisha Legislative Assembly